The 1988 British Formula Three season was the 38th season of the British Formula Three Championship. JJ Lehto took the BARC/BRDC Lucas British Formula 3 Championship.

BARC/BRDC Lucas British F3 Championship 
Champion:  JJ Lehto

Runner Up:  Gary Brabham

Class B Champion:  Alastair Lyall

Results

Lucas British Formula 3 Championship

Non-Championship Races

Championship Tables

Class A

Class B

References

Formula Three
British Formula Three Championship seasons